CCSP may refer to:

 Canadian Centre for Studies in Publishing, Simon Fraser University
 Certified  Chiropractic Sports Physician
 Certified Cloud Security Professional, a (ISC)² certification
 Cisco Certified Security Professional, a Cisco certification
 Climate Change Science Program
 Club cell secretory protein